The 36th Golden Raspberry Awards, or Razzies, ceremony, held by the Golden Raspberry Foundation, honored the worst films the film industry had to offer in 2015. The satirical ten-category Golden Raspberry Awards, commonly known as the Razzies, were presented during the ceremony. The nominations were revealed on January 13, 2016. The ceremony was held on February 27, 2016 beginning at 8:00 p.m. PST at the Palace Theater in Los Angeles, California.

Ceremony
Fifty Shades of Grey received the most awards, winning Worst Picture, Worst Actor, Worst Actress, Worst Screen Combo and Worst Screenplay. Fantastic Four tied for Worst Picture, also receiving Worst Director and Worst Remake, Rip-off or Sequel. Eddie Redmayne received Worst Supporting Actor for Jupiter Ascending, while Kaley Cuoco received Worst Supporting Actress for Alvin and the Chipmunks: The Road Chip and The Wedding Ringer. The Razzie Redeemer Award, given to former Razzie winners and nominees for quality work in film, was given to Sylvester Stallone for his Oscar-nominated role in Creed after receiving seven Razzie awards in the past. The winners were announced via parody sketches; one of them was performed by an impersonation of Donald Trump, who won Worst Supporting Actor at the 11th Golden Raspberry Awards in 1990. None of the winners or nominees attended the ceremony. Per tradition, the nominations announcement and the ceremony took place one day before their corresponding 88th Academy Awards ceremony. The Razzie Redeemer Award winner was decided through a public vote on Rotten Tomatoes, while the 943 members of the Golden Raspberry Foundation voted to determine the winners for the other categories. Membership is open to the public for a membership fee.

Winners and nominees

Films with multiple nominations
The following twelve films received multiple nominations:

Films with multiple wins
The following two films received multiple awards:

Box office performance of nominated films

See also
 22nd Screen Actors Guild Awards
 88th Academy Awards
 58th Grammy Awards
 68th Primetime Emmy Awards
 69th British Academy Film Awards
 70th Tony Awards
 73rd Golden Globe Awards
 List of submissions to the 88th Academy Awards for Best Foreign Language Film

References

External links
 

Golden Raspberry Awards ceremonies
Golden Raspberry
2016 in Los Angeles
2016 in American cinema
February 2016 events in the United States
Golden Raspberry
Events in Los Angeles